The Black River is a river in Connacht in Ireland. For much of its length it forms the border between County Galway and County Mayo. It flows past Shrule, and drains into Lough Corrib.

References

Rivers of County Galway
Rivers of County Mayo